Marco Dumberry (born ) is a Canadian male weightlifter, competing in the 69 kg category and representing Canada at international competitions. He competed at world championships, most recently at the 2003 World Weightlifting Championships.

Major results

References

1982 births
Living people
Canadian male weightlifters
Place of birth missing (living people)
20th-century Canadian people
21st-century Canadian people